Damaged is the ninth studio album by Lambchop, released on August 14, 2006.

Track listing
 "Paperback Bible" – 7:48
 "Prepared [2]" – 6:03
 "The Rise and Fall of the Letter P" – 3:36
 "A Day Without Glasses" – 4:11
 "Beers Before the Barbican" – 4:51
 "I Would Have Waited Here All Day" – 4:02
 "Crackers" – 4:11
 "Fear" – 5:00
 "Short" – 3:48
 "The Decline of Country and Western Civilization" – 4:36

Bonus disc
 "Pre" – 5:35
 "Fear(re)" – 4:30
 "Decline" – 4:44
 "Paperback Bible (With Drums)" – 6:04

Personnel
 William Tyler – guitars
 Tony Crow – piano
 Sam Baker – drums
 Matt Swanson – bass
 Kurt Wagner – guitar, vocals
 Alex McManus – guitars
 Deanna Varagona – baritone saxophone
 Paul Niehaus – steel guitar, electric guitar
 Marc Trovilion – electronics
 Jonathon Marx – electronics, sound interludes
 Ryan Norris – keyboards, electronics, sound interludes
 Scott Martin – drums, electronics, sound interludes
 Roy Agee – trombones
 Gary Tussing – cellos
 G daddy – acoustic guitar
 Bruce Colson violins
 Ames Asbell – viola
 Ben Westney – cello

References

2006 albums
Lambchop (band) albums
Merge Records albums